The Queen of the Clouds Tour was the first headlining concert tour by Swedish recording artist Tove Lo in support of her debut studio album, Queen of the Clouds (2014). The tour was officially announced nine months after the release of the album, on June 22, 2015. The tour began on September 28, 2015, in San Diego at the North Park Theatre and was scheduled to conclude on November 14, 2015, in Tove Lo's home city of Stockholm, Sweden, with a total of twenty shows over the span of three months. Unfortunately due to illness, Tove Lo was forced to cancel the tour's four European.

Set list
This set list is representative of the show in Minneapolis on October 10, 2015. It does not represent all dates throughout the tour.

"Not on Drugs"
"Got Love"
"The Way That I Am"
"Moments"
"My Gun"
"Like Em Young"
"Over"
"Scream My Name"
"Thousand Miles"
"This Time Around"
"Out of Mind"
"Crave"
"Talking Body"
"Paradise"
"Timebomb"
"Run On Love"
"Habits (Stay High)"

Shows

References

Tove Lo concert tours
2015 concert tours